Nogometni klub Bled, commonly referred to as NK Bled or simply Bled, is a Slovenian football club from Bled. The club was established in 1938.

Honours
Slovenian Third League
 Winners: 2017–18, 2018–19

Slovenian Fourth Division
 Winners: 1996–97

Slovenian Fifth Division
 Winners: 2010–11, 2012–13

 MNZG-Kranj Cup
 Winners: 2018–19

References

External links
Official website 

Football clubs in Slovenia
Sport in Bled
Association football clubs established in 1938
1938 establishments in Slovenia